Crime Perfeito (Portuguese for "Perfect Crime") is the only release by Virginie & Fruto Proibido, a band fronted by Virginie Boutaud (famous for being the vocalist of new wave band Metrô) and also comprising Don Beto (guitar), Nilton Leonardi (bass) and Albino Infantozzi (drums). It was released in 1988 by Epic Records. The band was founded also in 1988, two years after Virginie was fired from Metrô due to "creative divergences", and ended in 1995 after she decided to retire from the musical business until 2002, when Metrô reformed and she was reunited with them.

Unlike Virginie's previous releases with Metrô, Crime Perfeito was a commercial failure and received mostly mixed reviews at the time of its release; however, "Más Companhias" would become a minor hit after being used in the soundtrack of the telenovela Fera Radical, which ran from March to November 1988.

"Il était une fois" is fully sung in French.

Track listing

Personnel
 Virginie Boutaud – vocals, classical guitar (track 10)
 Don Beto – electric guitar
 Nilton Leonardi – bass
 Albino Infantozzi – drums, percussion
 Marco Mazzola – production

References

1988 debut albums
Epic Records albums
Portuguese-language albums
French-language albums
Virginie Boutaud albums